The 1978 Philadelphia Phillies season was the 96th season in the history of the franchise. The Phillies won their third straight National League East title with a record of 90–72, a game and a half over the Pittsburgh Pirates, as the Phillies defeated the Pirates in Pittsburgh on the next to last day of the season. For the third consecutive season the Phillies came up short in the NLCS, as the Los Angeles Dodgers defeated them three games to one, as they had the previous season. The Phillies were managed by Danny Ozark and  played their home games at Veterans Stadium.

Offseason 
 March 7, 1978: George Bell was signed as an amateur free agent by the Phillies.
 March 24, 1978: Fred Andrews was traded by the Phillies to the New York Mets for Bud Harrelson.

Regular season

Season standings

Record vs. opponents

Notable transactions 
 April 23, 1978: Julio Franco was signed by the Phillies as an amateur free agent.
 June 14, 1978: Bobby Brown and Jay Johnstone were traded by the Phillies to the New York Yankees for Rawly Eastwick.
 June 30, 1978: Carmen Castillo was signed by the Phillies as an amateur free agent.
 September 2, 1978: Dan Warthen was traded by the Phillies to the Houston Astros for Dan Larson.
 September 14, 1978: Horacio Piña was purchased by the Phillies from the Rieleros de Aguascalientes.

Draft picks 
 June 6, 1978: 1978 Major League Baseball draft
Ed Hearn was drafted by the Phillies in the 4th round.
Ryne Sandberg was drafted by the Phillies in the 20th round. Player signed June 15, 1978.
Rick Leach was drafted by the Phillies in the 24th round, but did not sign.

Phillie Phanatic 
The Phillie Phanatic debuted on April 25, 1978, at The Vet when the Phils played the Chicago Cubs. Tim McCarver introduced the Phanatic on the "Captain Noah and His Magical Ark" show on WPVI-TV in his role promoting the team. The Phanatic was originally portrayed by Dave Raymond.

Game log

|- style="background:#fbb"
| 1 || April 7 || Cardinals || 1–5 || Bob Forsch (1–0) || Steve Carlton (0–1) || None || 47,791 || 0–1
|- style="background:#bfb"
| 2 || April 8 || Cardinals || 7–0 || Larry Christenson (1–0) || Eric Rasmussen (0–1) || None || 24,441 || 1–1
|- style="background:#bfb"
| 3 || April 9 || Cardinals || 12–3 || Randy Lerch (1–0) || John Urrea (0–1) || None || 35,104 || 2–1
|- style="background:#bbb"
| – || April 11 || Expos || colspan=6 | Postponed (rain); 
|- style="background:#fbb"
| 4 || April 12 || Expos || 7–8 || Steve Rogers (1–1) || Jim Lonborg (0–1) || Bill Atkinson (1) || 19,110 || 2–2
|- style="background:#bfb"
| 5 || April 14 || @ Cardinals || 4–3 || Steve Carlton (1–1) || Pete Vuckovich (0–1) || Tug McGraw (1) || 17,921 || 3–2
|- style="background:#bfb"
| 6 || April 15 || @ Cardinals || 3–2  || Tug McGraw (1–0) || Pete Vuckovich (0–2) || None || 13,844 || 4–2
|- style="background:#fbb"
| 7 || April 16 || @ Cardinals || 0–5 || Bob Forsch (3–0) || Randy Lerch (1–1) || None || 11,495 || 4–3
|- style="background:#bfb"
| 8 || April 17 || @ Pirates || 6–2 || Jim Lonborg (1–1) || John Candelaria (1–2) || None || 7,343 || 5–3
|- style="background:#bbb"
| – || April 18 || @ Pirates || colspan=6 | Postponed (rain); 
|- style="background:#bbb"
| – || April 21 || @ Expos || colspan=6 | Postponed (rain); 
|- style="background:#fbb"
| 9 || April 22  || @ Expos || 3–7 || Wayne Twitchell (1–1) || Steve Carlton (1–2) || Stan Bahnsen (1) ||  || 5–4
|- style="background:#fbb"
| 10 || April 22  || @ Expos || 3–5 || Ross Grimsley (3–0) || Larry Christenson (1–1) || Stan Bahnsen (2) || 19,237 || 5–5
|- style="background:#fbb"
| 11 || April 23 || @ Expos || 2–5 || Steve Rogers (2–2) || Jim Lonborg (1–2) || Darold Knowles (1) || 17,922 || 5–6
|- style="background:#bfb"
| 12 || April 24 || Cubs || 12–2 || Randy Lerch (2–1) || Woodie Fryman (0–1) || None || 20,115 || 6–6
|- style="background:#bfb"
| 13 || April 25 || Cubs || 7–0 || Jim Kaat (1–0) || Dennis Lamp (1–3) || None || 17,227 || 7–6
|- style="background:#fbb"
| 14 || April 26 || Cubs || 2–4 || Rick Reuschel (3–2) || Steve Carlton (1–3) || Bruce Sutter (3) || 17,299 || 7–7
|- style="background:#bfb"
| 15 || April 28 || Padres || 3–2 || Larry Christenson (2–1) || Bob Owchinko (1–2) || Ron Reed (1) || 26,872 || 8–7
|- style="background:#bfb"
| 16 || April 29 || Padres || 7–2 || Jim Lonborg (2–2) || Dave Freisleben (0–2) || None || 28,390 || 9–7
|- style="background:#bfb"
| 17 || April 30 || Padres || 11–4 || Randy Lerch (3–1) || Randy Jones (1–2) || None || 31,101 || 10–7

|- style="background:#bfb"
| 18 || May 1 || @ Reds || 12–1 || Steve Carlton (2–3) || Tom Seaver (0–3) || None || 21,476 || 11–7
|- style="background:#fbb"
| 19 || May 3 || @ Reds || 3–12 || Fred Norman (4–0) || Larry Christenson (2–2) || None || 26,054 || 11–8
|- style="background:#bfb"
| 20 || May 5 || Mets || 9–4 || Jim Lonborg (3–2) || Nino Espinosa (1–2) || Tug McGraw (2) || 22,116 || 12–8
|- style="background:#bfb"
| 21 || May 6 || Mets || 7–2 || Steve Carlton (3–3) || Pat Zachry (3–1) || None || 22,250 || 13–8
|- style="background:#bfb"
| 22 || May 7 || Mets || 8–5 || Gene Garber (1–0) || Craig Swan (1–2) || Tug McGraw (3) || 39,106 || 14–8
|- style="background:#bbb"
| – || May 8 || Astros || colspan=6 | Postponed (rain); 
|- style="background:#fbb"
| 23 || May 9 || Astros || 1–5 || J. R. Richard (2–3) || Larry Christenson (2–3) || None || 18,144 || 14–9
|- style="background:#bfb"
| 24 || May 10 || Astros || 3–1 || Jim Lonborg (4–2) || Mark Lemongello (2–4) || None || 20,096 || 15–9
|- style="background:#bfb"
| 25 || May 11 || Reds || 4–1 || Steve Carlton (4–3) || Tom Seaver (1–4) || None || 32,580 || 16–9
|- style="background:#fbb"
| 26 || May 12 || Reds || 0–3 || Bill Bonham (4–0) || Randy Lerch (3–2) || Paul Moskau (1) || 38,179 || 16–10
|- style="background:#fbb"
| 27 || May 13 || Reds || 3–4 || Manny Sarmiento (3–1) || Tug McGraw (1–1) || None || 35,802 || 16–11
|- style="background:#bfb"
| 28 || May 14 || Reds || 7–4 || Larry Christenson (3–3) || Tom Hume (2–5) || Ron Reed (2) || 30,482 || 17–11
|- style="background:#fbb"
| 29 || May 15 || @ Astros || 0–5 || J. R. Richard (3–3) || Jim Lonborg (4–3) || None || 9,943 || 17–12
|- style="background:#fbb"
| 30 || May 16 || @ Astros || 1–6 || Mark Lemongello (3–4) || Steve Carlton (4–4) || None || 11,381 || 17–13
|- style="background:#fbb"
| 31 || May 17 || @ Astros || 1–2 || Joaquín Andújar (3–2) || Randy Lerch (3–3) || Tom Dixon (1) || 11,856 || 17–14
|- style="background:#bfb"
| 32 || May 18 || @ Astros || 8–5 || Gene Garber (2–0) || Joe Sambito (2–1) || None || 10,828 || 18–14
|- style="background:#fbb"
| 33 || May 19 || @ Mets || 3–4 || Skip Lockwood (3–3) || Tug McGraw (1–2) || None || 13,181 || 18–15
|- style="background:#bfb"
| 34 || May 20 || @ Mets || 9–4  || Tug McGraw (2–2) || Dale Murray (1–2) || None || 14,110 || 19–15
|- style="background:#fbb"
| 35 || May 21 || @ Mets || 5–6  || Skip Lockwood (4–3) || Tug McGraw (2–3) || None || 18,183 || 19–16
|- style="background:#bbb"
| – || May 23 || @ Cubs || colspan=6 | Postponed (rain); 
|- style="background:#fbb"
| 36 || May 24 || @ Cubs || 4–6  || Bruce Sutter (4–2) || Gene Garber (2–1) || None || 17,901 || 19–17
|- style="background:#fbb"
| 37 || May 25 || @ Cubs || 1–5 || Rick Reuschel (5–3) || Steve Carlton (4–5) || Bruce Sutter (6) || 19,788 || 19–18
|- style="background:#fbb"
| 38 || May 26 || @ Braves || 2–4 || Phil Niekro (5–6) || Randy Lerch (3–4) || None || 16,638 || 19–19
|- style="background:#bfb"
| 39 || May 27 || @ Braves || 6–5 || Tug McGraw (3–3) || Rick Camp (0–2) || Gene Garber (1) || 15,081 || 20–19
|- style="background:#fbb"
| 40 || May 28 || @ Braves || 3–5 || Preston Hanna (4–0) || Larry Christenson (3–4) || Jamie Easterly (1) || 22,233 || 20–20
|- style="background:#bfb"
| 41 || May 29 || Pirates || 4–3  || Warren Brusstar (1–0) || Dave Hamilton (0–1) || None || 34,353 || 21–20
|- style="background:#bfb"
| 42 || May 30 || Pirates || 6–1 || Steve Carlton (5–5) || Bert Blyleven (3–5) || None || 26,123 || 22–20
|- style="background:#fbb"
| 43 || May 31 || Pirates || 1–2 || John Candelaria (5–6) || Randy Lerch (3–5) || Kent Tekulve (5) || 29,595 || 22–21

|- style="background:#bfb"
| 44 || June 2 || Dodgers || 4–2 || Jim Lonborg (5–3) || Burt Hooton (4–5) || Gene Garber (2) || 42,347 || 23–21
|- style="background:#bfb"
| 45 || June 3 || Dodgers || 5–1 || Tug McGraw (4–3) || Terry Forster (1–1) || None || 31,442 || 24–21
|- style="background:#bfb"
| 46 || June 4 || Dodgers || 9–4 || Jim Kaat (2–0) || Tommy John (7–3) || None || 42,066 || 25–21
|- style="background:#bfb"
| 47 || June 5 || Giants || 4–3 || Steve Carlton (6–5) || Vida Blue (6–4) || Ron Reed (3) || 37,684 || 26–21
|- style="background:#bfb"
| 48 || June 6 || Giants || 7–6 || Tug McGraw (5–3) || Gary Lavelle (4–4) || None || 28,093 || 27–21
|- style="background:#bfb"
| 49 || June 7 || Giants || 5–4 || Tug McGraw (6–3) || Randy Moffitt (5–2) || None || 20,708 || 28–21
|- style="background:#bfb"
| 50 || June 9 || Braves || 6–1 || Larry Christenson (4–4) || Eddie Solomon (1–4) || None || 40,272 || 29–21
|- style="background:#bfb"
| 51 || June 10 || Braves || 6–2 || Jim Kaat (3–0) || Dick Ruthven (2–6) || Gene Garber (3) || 33,292 || 30–21
|- style="background:#fbb"
| 52 || June 11 || Braves || 0–4 || Phil Niekro (7–6) || Steve Carlton (6–6) || None || 58,367 || 30–22
|- style="background:#fbb"
| 53 || June 12 || @ Dodgers || 5–6 || Burt Hooton (5–5) || Jim Lonborg (5–4) || Lance Rautzhan (1) || 26,604 || 30–23
|- style="background:#fbb"
| 54 || June 13 || @ Dodgers || 3–5 || Don Sutton (5–6) || Randy Lerch (3–6) || None || 41,257 || 30–24
|- style="background:#fbb"
| 55 || June 14 || @ Giants || 1–2 || Vida Blue (8–4) || Larry Christenson (4–5) || Randy Moffitt (4) || 13,902 || 30–25
|- style="background:#fbb"
| 56 || June 15 || @ Giants || 1–6 || John Montefusco (6–2) || Jim Kaat (3–1) || None || 14,754 || 30–26
|- style="background:#bfb"
| 57 || June 16 || @ Padres || 5–0 || Steve Carlton (7–6) || Randy Jones (5–5) || None || 21,124 || 31–26
|- style="background:#fbb"
| 58 || June 17 || @ Padres || 0–7 || Bob Owchinko (4–6) || Jim Lonborg (5–5) || None || 27,319 || 31–27
|- style="background:#fbb"
| 59 || June 18 || @ Padres || 1–4 || Gaylord Perry (7–2) || Dick Ruthven (2–7) || Rollie Fingers (15) || 21,195 || 31–28
|- style="background:#fbb"
| 60 || June 20 || Cardinals || 2–4 || Bob Forsch (8–6) || Larry Christenson (4–6) || Mark Littell (2) || 30,119 || 31–29
|- style="background:#bbb"
| – || June 21 || Cardinals || colspan=6 | Postponed (rain); 
|- style="background:#bfb"
| 61 || June 22 || Cardinals || 2–1 || Steve Carlton (8–6) || John Denny (6–6) || None || 29,183 || 32–29
|- style="background:#bfb"
| 62 || June 23  || Cubs || 6–1 || Dick Ruthven (3–7) || Dave Roberts (3–2) || None ||  || 33–29
|- style="background:#bfb"
| 63 || June 23  || Cubs || 6–1 || Jim Lonborg (6–5) || Dennis Lamp (2–8) || None || 45,234 || 34–29
|- style="background:#bfb"
| 64 || June 24 || Cubs || 6–2 || Jim Kaat (4–1) || Ken Holtzman (1–2) || Ron Reed (4) || 41,605 || 35–29
|- style="background:#bfb"
| 65 || June 25 || Cubs || 4–2 || Larry Christenson (5–6) || Rick Reuschel (8–5) || None || 36,075 || 36–29
|- style="background:#fbb"
| 66 || June 26 || @ Expos || 1–5 || Steve Rogers (9–7) || Steve Carlton (8–7) || None || 19,487 || 36–30
|- style="background:#bfb"
| 67 || June 27 || @ Expos || 1–0 || Dick Ruthven (4–7) || Hal Dues (1–4) || None || 36,885 || 37–30
|- style="background:#bfb"
| 68 || June 28 || @ Expos || 7–5 || Jim Lonborg (7–5) || Mike Garman (0–3) || Tug McGraw (4) || 35,182 || 38–30
|- style="background:#bfb"
| 69 || June 29 || @ Cubs || 9–3 || Jim Kaat (5–1) || Dave Roberts (3–3) || Tug McGraw (5) || 25,669 || 39–30
|- style="background:#fbb"
| 70 || June 30  || @ Cubs || 0–2 || Mike Krukow (1–0) || Larry Christenson (5–7) || None ||  || 39–31
|- style="background:#bfb"
| 71 || June 30  || @ Cubs || 6–5 || Tug McGraw (7–3) || Bruce Sutter (5–3) || None || 29,525 || 40–31

|- style="background:#bfb"
| 72 || July 1 || @ Cubs || 2–1 || Randy Lerch (4–6) || Dennis Lamp (2–10) || Ron Reed (5) || 26,042 || 41–31
|- style="background:#bfb"
| 73 || July 2 || @ Cubs || 6–5 || Dick Ruthven (5–7) || Ken Holtzman (1–3) || Tug McGraw (6) || 25,934 || 42–31
|- style="background:#bbb"
| – || July 3 || @ Mets || colspan=6 | Postponed (rain); 
|- style="background:#fbb"
| 74 || July 4  || @ Mets || 0–4 || Pat Zachry (10–3) || Larry Christenson (5–8) || None ||  || 42–32
|- style="background:#bfb"
| 75 || July 4  || @ Mets || 3–2 || Rawly Eastwick (3–1) || Craig Swan (1–5) || Ron Reed (6) || 10,410 || 43–32
|- style="background:#bfb"
| 76 || July 5 || @ Mets || 7–5 || Warren Brusstar (2–0) || Jerry Koosman (2–9) || Tug McGraw (7) || 8,667 || 44–32
|- style="background:#bfb"
| 77 || July 6 || Expos || 7–6 || Rawly Eastwick (4–1) || Ross Grimsley (11–6) || None || 50,149 || 45–32
|- style="background:#fbb"
| 78 || July 7 || Expos || 4–7 || Steve Rogers (11–7) || Dick Ruthven (5–8) || Mike Garman (6) || 45,193 || 45–33
|- style="background:#bfb"
| 79 || July 8  || Expos || 6–3 || Larry Christenson (6–8) || Woodie Fryman (3–7) || Ron Reed (7) ||  || 46–33
|- style="background:#fbb"
| 80 || July 8  || Expos || 1–8 || Hal Dues (3–4) || Jim Lonborg (7–6) || None || 50,098 || 46–34
|- style="background:#bfb"
| 81 || July 9 || Expos || 8–7 || Tug McGraw (8–3) || Darold Knowles (2–2) || None || 40,949 || 47–34
|- style="background:#bbcaff;"
| – || July 11 ||colspan=7 |1978 Major League Baseball All-Star Game at San Diego Stadium in San Diego
|- style="background:#fbb"
| 82 || July 14 || @ Braves || 2–7 || Phil Niekro (10–9) || Steve Carlton (8–8) || None || 17,464 || 47–35
|- style="background:#fbb"
| 83 || July 15 || @ Braves || 2–3 || Rick Camp (2–2) || Jim Kaat (5–2) || Gene Garber (12) || N/A || 47–36
|- style="background:#bfb"
| 84 || July 16 || @ Braves || 4–2 || Dick Ruthven (6–8) || Preston Hanna (7–6) || Ron Reed (8) || 20,734 || 48–36
|- style="background:#fbb"
| 85 || July 17 || @ Astros || 1–2  || Joe Niekro (6–7) || Rawly Eastwick (4–2) || None || 14,397 || 48–37
|- style="background:#fbb"
| 86 || July 18 || @ Astros || 1–9 || J. R. Richard (9–9) || Jim Lonborg (7–7) || None || 15,478 || 48–38
|- style="background:#fbb"
| 87 || July 19 || Reds || 2–7 || Dave Tomlin (6–1) || Steve Carlton (8–9) || Doug Bair (16) || 45,608 || 48–39
|- style="background:#bfb"
| 88 || July 20 || Reds || 8–6 || Warren Brusstar (3–0) || Manny Sarmiento (7–6) || Tug McGraw (8) || 44,054 || 49–39
|- style="background:#bfb"
| 89 || July 21  || Astros || 6–1 || Dick Ruthven (7–8) || Joe Niekro (6–8) || None ||  || 50–39
|- style="background:#bfb"
| 90 || July 21  || Astros || 8–2 || Larry Christenson (7–8) || Rick Williams (1–2) || None || 35,389 || 51–39
|- style="background:#bfb"
| 91 || July 22 || Astros || 3–2  || Ron Reed (1–0) || Ken Forsch (4–4) || None || 33,672 || 52–39
|- style="background:#bfb"
| 92 || July 23 || Astros || 13–2 || Steve Carlton (9–9) || Tom Dixon (5–7) || None || 30,554 || 53–39
|- style="background:#fbb"
| 93 || July 24 || Braves || 1–5 || Eddie Solomon (3–4) || Jim Lonborg (7–8) || Craig Skok (2) || 30,184 || 53–40
|- style="background:#fbb"
| 94 || July 25 || Braves || 0–4 || Tommy Boggs (2–5) || Larry Christenson (7–9) || None || 25,954 || 53–41
|- style="background:#fbb"
| 95 || July 26 || Braves || 2–4 || Phil Niekro (12–10) || Jim Kaat (5–3) || None || 50,218 || 53–42
|- style="background:#bfb"
| 96 || July 28  || @ Reds || 12–2 || Randy Lerch (5–6) || Fred Norman (9–6) || None ||  || 54–42
|- style="background:#fbb"
| 97 || July 28  || @ Reds || 1–2 || Tom Seaver (10–9) || Steve Carlton (9–10) || Doug Bair (18) || 51,779 || 54–43
|- style="background:#fbb"
| 98 || July 29 || @ Reds || 2–6 || Paul Moskau (2–2) || Jim Lonborg (7–9) || None || 49,108 || 54–44
|- style="background:#fbb"
| 99 || July 30 || @ Reds || 3–5 || Tom Hume (5–10) || Larry Christenson (7–10) || Doug Bair (19) || 44,092 || 54–45
|- style="background:#bfb"
| 100 || July 31 || Mets || 6–1 || Dick Ruthven (8–8) || Nino Espinosa (9–9) || None || 21,133 || 55–45

|- style="background:#fbb"
| 101 || August 1 || Mets || 1–5 || Kevin Kobel (2–2) || Steve Carlton (9–11) || None || 31,085 || 55–46
|- style="background:#bfb"
| 102 || August 2 || Mets || 8–6 || Randy Lerch (6–6) || Jerry Koosman (3–12) || Tug McGraw (9) || 32,382 || 56–46
|- style="background:#bfb"
| 103 || August 4  || @ Pirates || 2–0 || Larry Christenson (8–10) || Jim Rooker (6–8) || None ||  || 57–46
|- style="background:#fbb"
| 104 || August 4  || @ Pirates || 2–5 || Don Robinson (6–5) || Jim Kaat (5–4) || None || 30,865 || 57–47
|- style="background:#bbb"
| – || August 5 || @ Pirates || colspan=6 | Postponed (rain); 
|- style="background:#bfb"
| 105 || August 6  || @ Pirates || 3–2 || Dick Ruthven (9–8) || Bert Blyleven (9–7) || None ||  || 58–47
|- style="background:#bfb"
| 106 || August 6  || @ Pirates || 5–0 || Steve Carlton (10–11) || Jim Bibby (6–6) || None || 31,141 || 59–47
|- style="background:#fbb"
| 107 || August 7 || @ Cardinals || 3–6 || Aurelio López (1–1) || Randy Lerch (6–7) || Mark Littell (6) || 18,671 || 59–48
|- style="background:#fbb"
| 108 || August 8  || @ Cardinals || 0–2 || Pete Vuckovich (9–9) || Larry Christenson (8–11) || None ||  || 59–49
|- style="background:#fbb"
| 109 || August 8  || @ Cardinals || 2–6 || Tom Bruno (2–0) || Jim Lonborg (7–10) || None || 26,880 || 59–50
|- style="background:#bfb"
| 110 || August 9 || @ Cardinals || 6–3 || Jim Kaat (6–4) || Bob Forsch (9–13) || Ron Reed (9) || 16,172 || 60–50
|- style="background:#bfb"
| 111 || August 10 || Pirates || 3–1 || Dick Ruthven (10–8) || Bert Blyleven (9–8) || None || 34,672 || 61–50
|- style="background:#bfb"
| 112 || August 11 || Pirates || 15–4 || Steve Carlton (11–11) || Bruce Kison (3–4) || None || 35,101 || 62–50
|- style="background:#bfb"
| 113 || August 12 || Pirates || 10–1 || Randy Lerch (7–7) || Jim Bibby (6–7) || None || 30,110 || 63–50
|- style="background:#fbb"
| 114 || August 13 || Pirates || 3–7 || Don Robinson (8–5) || Larry Christenson (8–12) || None || 38,119 || 63–51
|- style="background:#fbb"
| 115 || August 15 || Dodgers || 4–5 || Doug Rau (12–7) || Dick Ruthven (10–9) || Lance Rautzhan (4) || 38,386 || 63–52
|- style="background:#fbb"
| 116 || August 16 || Dodgers || 2–5 || Bob Welch (5–0) || Jim Kaat (6–5) || None || 37,660 || 63–53
|- style="background:#fbb"
| 117 || August 17 || Dodgers || 2–5 || Burt Hooton (13–8) || Tug McGraw (8–4) || Terry Forster (15) || 36,325 || 63–54
|- style="background:#fbb"
| 118 || August 18 || Giants || 5–6 || Gary Lavelle (10–9) || Tug McGraw (8–5) || None || 36,554 || 63–55
|- style="background:#bfb"
| 119 || August 19 || Giants || 3–0 || Steve Carlton (12–11) || John Montefusco (9–5) || None || 54,288 || 64–55
|- style="background:#bfb"
| 120 || August 20 || Giants || 5–3 || Dick Ruthven (11–9) || Jim Barr (6–10) || Ron Reed (10) || 51,088 || 65–55
|- style="background:#fbb"
| 121 || August 21 || Padres || 3–7 || Gaylord Perry (15–5) || Warren Brusstar (3–1) || Bob Shirley (4) || 27,124 || 65–56
|- style="background:#bfb"
| 122 || August 22 || Padres || 5–3 || Larry Christenson (9–12) || Eric Rasmussen (12–10) || Ron Reed (11) || 36,339 || 66–56
|- style="background:#fbb"
| 123 || August 23 || Padres || 5–6 || Rollie Fingers (5–11) || Ron Reed (1–1) || None || 31,032 || 66–57
|- style="background:#fbb"
| 124 || August 24 || @ Dodgers || 4–5 || Tommy John (15–9) || Warren Brusstar (3–2) || Charlie Hough (7) || 49,064 || 66–58
|- style="background:#fbb"
| 125 || August 25 || @ Dodgers || 5–6 || Lance Rautzhan (2–0) || Ron Reed (1–2) || None || 46,548 || 66–59
|- style="background:#bfb"
| 126 || August 26 || @ Dodgers || 3–1 || Randy Lerch (8–7) || Doug Rau (12–8) || None || 50,194 || 67–59
|- style="background:#bfb"
| 127 || August 27 || @ Dodgers || 9–3 || Larry Christenson (10–12) || Bob Welch (5–2) || None || 43,065 || 68–59
|- style="background:#bfb"
| 128 || August 28 || @ Padres || 6–1 || Jim Kaat (7–5) || Randy Jones (11–12) || None || 33,768 || 69–59
|- style="background:#bfb"
| 129 || August 29 || @ Padres || 9–5 || Dick Ruthven (12–9) || Bob Owchinko (8–11) || None || 13,568 || 70–59
|- style="background:#bfb"
| 130 || August 30 || @ Padres || 6–5 || Warren Brusstar (4–2) || Rollie Fingers (5–12) || None || 15,941 || 71–59

|- style="background:#fbb"
| 131 || September 1 || @ Giants || 3–4 || Gary Lavelle (11–9) || Steve Carlton (12–12) || None || 16,413 || 71–60
|- style="background:#bfb"
| 132 || September 2 || @ Giants || 3–1  || Larry Christenson (11–12) || Gary Lavelle (11–10) || None || 27,457 || 72–60
|- style="background:#fbb"
| 133 || September 3  || @ Giants || 1–4 || Bob Knepper (15–9) || Dick Ruthven (12–10) || None ||  || 72–61
|- style="background:#fbb"
| 134 || September 3  || @ Giants || 2–3 || John Montefusco (10–6) || Warren Brusstar (4–3) || John Curtis (1) || 39,596 || 72–62
|- style="background:#fbb"
| 135 || September 4  || @ Cardinals || 2–3 || Bob Forsch (11–15) || Randy Lerch (8–8) || Mark Littell (9) ||  || 72–63
|- style="background:#bfb"
| 136 || September 4  || @ Cardinals || 10–2 || Jim Lonborg (8–10) || Silvio Martínez (8–8) || None || 19,015 || 73–63
|- style="background:#bfb"
| 137 || September 6 || @ Cubs || 8–1 || Steve Carlton (13–12) || Rick Reuschel (13–12) || None || 14,269 || 74–63
|- style="background:#bfb"
| 138 || September 7 || @ Cubs || 5–3 || Warren Brusstar (5–3) || Donnie Moore (9–7) || Ron Reed (12) || 11,427 || 75–63
|- style="background:#bfb"
| 139 || September 8  || Cardinals || 1–0 || Dick Ruthven (13–10) || Tom Bruno (4–2) || None ||  || 76–63
|- style="background:#bfb"
| 140 || September 8  || Cardinals || 2–1 || Ron Reed (2–2) || Dan O'Brien (0–1) || None || 35,160 || 77–63
|- style="background:#bfb"
| 141 || September 9 || Cardinals || 6–3 || Randy Lerch (9–8) || Bob Forsch (11–16) || None || 35,824 || 78–63
|- style="background:#fbb"
| 142 || September 10 || Cardinals || 6–8  || Mark Littell (2–8) || Ron Reed (2–3) || Buddy Schultz (6) || 33,106 || 78–64
|- style="background:#bfb"
| 143 || September 11 || Pirates || 10–3 || Steve Carlton (14–12) || Don Robinson (12–6) || None || 33,198 || 79–64
|- style="background:#fbb"
| 144 || September 12 || Pirates || 1–5 || John Candelaria (11–11) || Larry Christenson (11–13) || Kent Tekulve (29) || 31,355 || 79–65
|- style="background:#bfb"
| 145 || September 13 || Cubs || 6–2 || Dick Ruthven (14–10) || Ray Burris (5–12) || None || 30,114 || 80–65
|- style="background:#bfb"
| 146 || September 14 || Cubs || 11–5 || Warren Brusstar (6–3) || Rick Reuschel (14–13) || Ron Reed (13) || 20,037 || 81–65
|- style="background:#fbb"
| 147 || September 15 || Mets || 4–5  || Dale Murray (9–5) || Tug McGraw (8–6) || None || 29,257 || 81–66
|- style="background:#bfb"
| 148 || September 16 || Mets || 2–1  || Steve Carlton (15–12) || Dwight Bernard (1–2) || None || 44,307 || 82–66
|- style="background:#fbb"
| 149 || September 17 || Mets || 0–2 || Mike Bruhert (4–9) || Larry Christenson (11–14) || None || 35,301 || 82–67
|- style="background:#fbb"
| 150 || September 19 || @ Expos || 2–5 || Scott Sanderson (3–2) || Dick Ruthven (14–11) || Mike Garman (13) || 9,429 || 82–68
|- style="background:#bfb"
| 151 || September 20 || @ Expos || 4–2 || Randy Lerch (10–8) || Dan Schatzeder (7–6) || Ron Reed (14) || 9,298 || 83–68
|- style="background:#bbb"
| – || September 21 || @ Expos || colspan=6 | Postponed (rain); 
|- style="background:#bbb"
| – || September 22 || @ Mets || colspan=6 | Postponed (rain); 
|- style="background:#bfb"
| 152 || September 23  || @ Mets || 1–0 || Larry Christenson (12–14) || Mike Bruhert (4–10) || None ||  || 84–68
|- style="background:#bfb"
| 153 || September 23  || @ Mets || 6–3 || Dick Ruthven (15–11) || Dwight Bernard (1–3) || None || 9,694 || 85–68
|- style="background:#bfb"
| 154 || September 24 || @ Mets || 8–2 || Steve Carlton (16–12) || Nino Espinosa (10–15) || None || 25,473 || 86–68
|- style="background:#bfb"
| 155 || September 25 || Expos || 3–2  || Ron Reed (3–3) || Stan Bahnsen (1–5) || None || 11,651 || 87–68
|- style="background:#bfb"
| 156 || September 26  || Expos || 5–3 || Jim Kaat (8–5) || David Palmer (0–1) || Ron Reed (15) ||  || 88–68
|- style="background:#fbb"
| 157 || September 26  || Expos || 0–3 || Rudy May (8–10) || Tug McGraw (8–7) || None || 29,506 || 88–69
|- style="background:#bfb"
| 158 || September 27 || Expos || 5–4 || Larry Christenson (13–14) || Ross Grimsley (19–11) || Ron Reed (16) || 27,410 || 89–69
|- style="background:#fbb"
| 159 || September 29  || @ Pirates || 4–5 || Kent Tekulve (7–7) || Ron Reed (3–4) || None ||  || 89–70
|- style="background:#fbb"
| 160 || September 29  || @ Pirates || 1–2 || Kent Tekulve (8–7) || Steve Carlton (16–13) || None || 45,134 || 89–71
|- style="background:#bfb"
| 161 || September 30 || @ Pirates || 10–8 || Randy Lerch (11–8) || Grant Jackson (7–5) || Ron Reed (17) || 28,905 || 90–71

|- style="background:#fbb"
| 162 || October 1 || @ Pirates || 3–5 || Odell Jones (2–0) || Kevin Saucier (0–1) || Kent Tekulve (31) || 30,224 || 90–72

|-
| style="font-size:88%" |
The May 18, 1978, game was protested by the Phillies in the top of the seventh inning. The protest was later denied.
The attendance for the July 15, 1978, game at Atlanta was not available on the baseball-reference.com website and was omitted from Associated Press box scores.
|-
|  Source:

Roster

Player stats

Batting

Starters by position 
Note: Pos = Position; G = Games played; AB = At bats; H = Hits; Avg. = Batting average; HR = Home runs; RBI = Runs batted in

Other batters 
Note: G = Games played; AB = At bats; H = Hits; Avg. = Batting average; HR = Home runs; RBI = Runs batted in

Pitching

Starting pitchers 
Note: G = Games pitched; IP = Innings pitched; W = Wins; L = Losses; ERA = Earned run average; SO = Strikeouts

Relief pitchers 
Note: G = Games pitched; W = Wins; L = Losses; SV = Saves; ERA = Earned run average; SO = Strikeouts

1978 National League Championship Series 

The Los Angeles Dodgers win the Series, 3 games to 1, over the Phillies.

Postseason game log

|- style="background:#fbb"
| 1 || October 4 || Dodgers || 5–9 || Bob Welch (1–0) || Larry Christenson (0–1) || None || 63,460 || 0–1
|- style="background:#fbb"
| 2 || October 5 || Dodgers || 0–4 || Tommy John (1–0) || Dick Ruthven (0–1) || None || 60,642 || 0–2
|- style="background:#bfb"
| 3 || October 6 || @ Dodgers || 9–4 || Steve Carlton (1–0) || Don Sutton (0–1) || None || 55,043 || 1–2
|- style="background:#fbb"
| 4 || October 7 || @ Dodgers || 3–4  || Terry Forster (1–0) || Tug McGraw (0–1) || None || 55,124 || 1–3

|-
|  Source:

Awards and honors 
Greg Luzinski, Roberto Clemente Award

Farm system

Notes

References 
Baseball Reference: 1978 Philadelphia Phillies season

External links 

Philadelphia Phillies seasons
Philadelphia Phillies season
National League East champion seasons
Philadelph